Yellowstone National Park contains at least 45 named waterfalls and cascades, and hundreds more unnamed, even undiscovered waterfalls over  high.

Northwest quadrant

 Firehole Falls, Firehole River, 
 Gibbon Falls, Gibbon River, 
 Hidden Falls, Blacktail Deer Creek
 Little Gibbon Falls, Gibbon River
 Osprey Falls, Gardner River, 
 Undine Falls, Lava Creek, 
 Upper 
 Lower 
 Rustic Falls, Glen Creek, 
 Silver Cascades, Stephans Creek
 Virginia Cascades, Gibbon River, 
 Wraith Falls, Lava Creek,

Northeast quadrant

 Birdseye Falls
 Citadel of Asgard Falls, Mystery Creek
 Crystal Falls, Cascade Creek, 
 Enchantress Falls, Beauty Creek
 Faires' Fall, Amethyst Creek
 Knowles Falls, Yellowstone River, 
 Silver Cord Cascade, Surface Creek, 
 Tower Fall, Tower Creek
 Yellowstone Falls, Yellowstone River
 Upper Falls, 
 Lower Falls,

Southwest quadrant

 Albright Falls, Bechler River,  
 Cave Falls, Fall River, 
 Bechler Falls, Bechler River, 
 Cascades of the Firehole, Firehole River, 
 Chasm Falls, Ouzel Creek
 Childhood's Dream Falls, Ouzel Creek
 Colonnade Falls, Bechler River, 
 Upper 
 Lower 
 Dunanda Falls, Boundary Creek, 
 Emerald Pool Falls, Ouzel Creek
 Fairy Falls, Fairy Creek, 
 Fern Cascades, Iron Spring Creek, 
 Gwinna Falls, Bechler River, 
 Hourglass Falls (see Quiver Cascade)
 Iris Falls, Bechler River, 
 Kepler Cascades, Firehole River,
 Lewis Canyon Falls, Lewis River
 Upper Falls, 
 Lower Falls, 
 Lewis Falls, Lewis River, 
 Lily Falls, Unnamed Creek, 
 Moose Falls, Crawfish Creek, 
 Morning Falls, Ash Mountain Creek
 Mystic Falls, Little Firehole River, 
 Ouzel Falls, Ouzel Creek, 
 Quiver Cascade, Bechler River, 
 Ragged Falls, Bechler River, 
 Rainbow Falls, Fall River
 Silver Scarf Falls, East Fork Boundary Creek, 
 Tempe Cascade, Bechler River, 
 Terraced Falls, Fall River, 
 Tendoy Falls, Bechler River, Ferris Fork, 
 "Treasure Falls", "Lilliputian Creek" (Treasure Island of the Bechler River)
 Twister Falls, Bechler River, 
 Union Falls, Mountain Ash Creek, 
 Wahhi Falls, Bechler River, 
 Upper 
 Lower

Southeast quadrant

 Crecelius Cascade, Eleanor Lake

Further reading

Notes

 
Lists of landforms of Wyoming
Waterfalls
Yellowstone National Park